Phytoecia sikkimensis is a species of beetle in the family Cerambycidae. It was described by Maurice Pic in 1907. It is known from India.

References

Phytoecia
Beetles described in 1907